Andrus Jamerson Peat (born November 4, 1993) is an American football guard for the New Orleans Saints of the National Football League (NFL). He played college football at Stanford. As a high school senior, he was considered the best college football recruit by Sporting News.

High school career
Peat attended Corona del Sol High School in Tempe, Arizona, where he was a letterman in football, basketball and track. In basketball, he played as a center, leading his basketball team to win the Division 1 state championship as a senior. In track and field, Peat competed as a shot putter and discus thrower.

By May 2011, Peat received 38 scholarship offers from college football teams. , Scout.com ranked him as a five-star recruit and the second-best offensive tackle in his class, Rivals.com rates him as a five-star recruit and the third-best offensive tackle in his class, and ESPN grades him out at 83 overall and the 16th-best player in his class. He was considered the best recruit in his class by Sporting News. He committed to Stanford on February 1, 2012. He was offered scholarships from Nebraska, Florida State, USC, Arizona, UCLA, Colorado, LSU, North Carolina, Oregon State, Clemson, Washington, Kansas, Tennessee, Auburn, Arkansas, Arizona State, Florida, Notre Dame, Michigan, Texas, Alabama, Miami, and Oregon.

College career
As a freshman, Peat played in 13 games and averaged 20 snaps per game. He started all 14 games as a sophomore in 2013. As a junior in 2014, he won the Morris Trophy and was named an All-American.

After his junior season, Peat entered the 2015 NFL Draft.

Professional career
At the 2015 NFL Combine, commentator Mike Mayock appraised Peat's 40-yard dash, "He's got dancing feet with that lower body, it's unbelievable. Look at that body. Look at that bubble butt." On April 30, 2015, Peat was selected with the 13th pick by the New Orleans Saints in the 2015 NFL draft.

On May 21, 2015, he reached an agreement with the Saints on a four-year, $11.39 million contract. It also included a $6.54 million signing bonus and is fully guaranteed. He began the 2015 season as a backup offensive guard. On September 20, 2015, he received his first career start at left guard in a loss to the Tampa Bay Buccaneers. During a week 6 matchup against the Atlanta Falcons, Peat suffered a leg injury that would force him out of action for the next 3 games. He finished his rookie campaign with 8 starts and played in 12 games. Throughout the season he split starts with offensive guard Tim Lelito.

Peat began the 2016 season as the starting left guard but started Weeks 3 and 4 at left tackle after Terron Armstead suffered a knee injury.

In 2017, Peat started 14 games at left guard for the Saints. In the wild card round of the playoffs, Peat was carted off with an air cast on his left leg. He was diagnosed with a broken fibula and a high ankle sprain and was placed on injured reserve on January 10, 2018.

On April 13, 2018, the Saints picked up the fifth-year option on Peat's contract.

On March 23, 2020, Peat signed a five-year, $57.5 million contract with the Saints.

On October 30, 2021, Peat was placed on injured reserve after suffering a torn pectoral in Week 7.

Personal life
Peat is the son of former offensive guard Todd Peat, who played for nine seasons in the National Football League for the St. Louis/Phoenix Cardinals and Los Angeles Raiders. His older brother, Todd Jr., is a former defensive tackle for the Nebraska Cornhuskers. His younger brother, Cassius Peat, played college football for Scottsdale Community College. His sister Leilani plays women's college basketball for the Seattle Redhawks. His younger brother Koa Peat is a 2025 basketball 5 star recruit. His spouse is Ashley Simmons.

References

External links
Stanford Cardinal bio
New Orleans Saints bio

1993 births
Living people
American football offensive tackles
New Orleans Saints players
Players of American football from Arizona
Sportspeople from Chandler, Arizona
Sportspeople from Tempe, Arizona
Stanford Cardinal football players
National Conference Pro Bowl players